Brahim is a surname, the word being a variant of Ibrahim. Notable people with the surname include:

Ahmat Brahim (born 1982), Chadian footballer
Ahmed Brahim (Al-Qaeda) (born 1945), convicted al-Qaeda member from Algeria
Ahmed Brahim (Tunisian politician)
Amel Brahim-Djelloul, soprano opera singer and concert recitalist
Mariam Brahim (born 1956), Chadian physician
Yassine Brahim, Tunisian engineer, manager and politician